Lieutenant-Colonel Henry Stuart Townend  (24 April 1909 – 26 October 2002) was a British military officer, athlete, headmaster, and politician. Townend was the first headmaster to educate an heir to the British throne, having founded Hill House School in 1949.

Early life
Born at Shrawardine, Shropshire, the son of a Church of England clergyman, the Rev. F. W. Townend, later of Tilney St Lawrence, Townend was educated at St Edmund's School, Canterbury, Brasenose College, Oxford and the University of St. Gallen, Switzerland.

Sporting career
Townend went up to Oxford in 1928, where he became president of the Oxford University Athletic Club and winner of six Oxford University blues. In 1930 he won a gold medal at the British Empire Games in Hamilton, Ontario, in the 4x440 yard relay.

Professional career
After university, Townend joined the Royal Artillery in 1931. He was commissioned in 1933 and held the appointment of Assistant Quartermaster general during the war. He served in north-west Europe and India. He attained the appointment of Assistant Adjutant-General, World Wide Air Movements at the War Office. He retired from the army in 1947 to become housing chairman of the London Olympics, organising the accommodation at short notice for the athletes and officials attending the event to be held the following year. There was no time or money to build athletes’ villages, and 3500 of the athletes and sportsmen were put in three camps in Richmond Park, Uxbridge and High Wycombe. The remainder and all the officials were put up in 41 schools and colleges across London. As a reward for his efforts, he was given an OBE in 1949. He was director-general of the Hotels and Restaurants Association. He was a director of an international publishing company and of an international school in Switzerland and a director and founder of the Anglo-Swiss Society of Great Britain. He founded Hill House School, in Knightsbridge, London in 1951 with his wife. In 1956 Prince Charles attended the school as pupil. It was the first time an heir to the British throne had been sent to school, as opposed to being educated by private tutors. Townend championed a "stripped down to basics" approach to independent education that enabled him to keep his fees among the lowest in the country. He continued to run the school until his death in 2002 aged 93. At that time it was reportedly the world's largest private junior school with over 1100 pupils.

Political career
He was for 10 years a member of Paddington Borough Council. He was Liberal candidate for the Torquay division of Devon for the Liberal Party at the 1950 General Election; 

He was Liberal candidate for the Falmouth and Camborne division of Cornwall for the Liberal Party at the 1950 General Election; 

He did not stand for parliament again. He left the Liberal Party and joined the Conservatives. In 1958 he was elected to the London County Council as a member for Chelsea. He served two terms before standing down in 1965.

References

Further reading
 Sullivan, Neil. (2011) The King of Hans Place: The Story of a Remarkable Man and a Remarkable School. Tenterden: Gresham Books.

External links 
 Stuart Townend's obituary at The Times
 Stuart Townend's obituary at The Independent

1909 births
2002 deaths
English male middle-distance runners
Athletes (track and field) at the 1930 British Empire Games
Commonwealth Games gold medallists for England
Commonwealth Games medallists in athletics
Heads of schools in London
Members of Paddington Metropolitan Borough Council
Members of London County Council
Members of Chelsea Metropolitan Borough Council
Liberal Party (UK) parliamentary candidates
British sportsperson-politicians
People educated at St Edmund's School Canterbury
Alumni of Brasenose College, Oxford
British Army personnel of World War II
Royal Artillery officers
Medallists at the 1930 British Empire Games